The Sangley Rebellion was a series of armed confrontations between Overseas Chinese, known as the Sangley, and the Spanish and their allied forces in Manila, Captaincy General of the Philippines, in October 1603. The Chinese had dominated trading and outnumbered Spanish residents in Manila by a five-to-one ratio. The Spanish feared and resented them. Policies of persecution were enacted against the Chinese and they were expelled from the city to an undesirable swamp area in 1586, which the Chinese turned into a thriving town. The Chinese planned a strike due to worsening relations, but it resulted in the execution of their mayor, and became a rebellion. It ended in the massacre of more than 20,000 Chinese in Manila by Spanish, Japanese, and Filipino forces.

Background

Chinese settlement
Chinese merchants had been making trading voyages to Manila well before the Spanish arrival. The Chinese were noted in the first Spanish records of the area made by Magellan in 1521 and Loaysa in 1527. In 1570, the Spanish conquered Manila. The locals had started developing a monarchical institution only recently under Muslim influence; they did not raise sustained opposition to Spanish occupation after their king's town was destroyed. The Chinese had been settled across the Pasig River in an area granted to them by the Muslim king. They were initially friendly toward the Spanish, who had rescued a disabled Chinese ship off Mindoro in 1571. Some of the rescued visited Manila in 1572 with large cargo shipments. In 1573 the first cargo of Chinese goods was shipped to Acapulco across the Pacific Ocean in New Spain. Trade with the Chinese continued until the Chinese dominated nearly all the trade entering the Americas from Manila.

Spanish control

Armed conflict between the Chinese and Spanish soon erupted. In 1574, the pirate Lin Feng tried to take Manila on November 29 and December 2, being repelled both times. He withdrew to Pangasinan, where he was ejected in March 1575 by a force of Spanish and Filipino soldiers. An officer from the Ming dynasty, Wang Wanggao, who had been sent to track down Lin Feng, was received cordially in Manila. He returned to Fujian with two Spanish envoys and two priests hoping to gain permission to proselytize in China. Although the initial reception to the Spanish in China was positive, the negotiations soon floundered, and the relationship between the Chinese and Spanish became more violent.

By 1586, the Spanish had become concerned with the amount of profit the Chinese were making from trade. They were also concerned about being far outnumbered by the Chinese, who totaled 10,000 in Manila in comparison to 2,000 Spaniards. The Spanish forced the Chinese out of the city to a swampy area northeast of the city walls. Despite the setback, the Chinese soon developed this as a thriving town with a pond in its center. By 1590, in addition to trade, the Chinese dominated industries such as bread-making, book-binding, tavern-keeping, and stone-masonry. 

In 1587, the Dominicans built a church to proselytize to the Chinese. Their letters back to their order from 1589 and 1590 claim that there was considerable interest from the Chinese to convert and adapt their culture to the Spanish model. By 1603 the Spanish colonial authorities made it an established practice to appoint a Christian Chinese as mayor over all the Chinese. At the same time, the Spanish sought to restrict Chinese enterprises. 

Around 1600 the Spanish started selling a limited number of residence permits, only 4,000, to the Chinese at 2 reals each. The Spanish also tried to restrict Chinese trade. A decree was approved in 1589 to make all prices of Chinese imports uniform and agreed upon prior to the trading season. In 1593 the Spanish closed Peru to Chinese imports and prohibited Spanish voyages to China. Only certain Spaniards were allowed to trade Chinese goods.

Armed conflict
In 1593, Governor Gómez Pérez Dasmariñas was killed in a mutiny by his Chinese rowers. The rowers fled to Vietnam, where most of them stayed. Some returned to China, where their leader was punished. Fearing an attack by the local Chinese in Manila, the Spanish forced them to relocate to the north side of the Pasig. In 1596, 12,000 Chinese were ejected from Manila and sent back to China. In 1603, the Spanish conflicts of fear of the Chinese, dependence on them and the China trade, and the effects of continued immigration resulted in efforts to suppress them and the massacre of over 20,000 Chinese.

Incident

Background

Two Fujian adventurers, Yan Yinglong and Zhang Yi, told Gao Cai, a eunuch tax and mines commissioner in Fujian, that there was a mountain of gold on the Cavite Peninsula in Manila Bay. A plan was made to send a naval expedition to obtain said gold by attacking Manila, but several censors protested this. Provincial authorities did not believe there was gold where Zhang Yi described but felt they had to send some kind of expedition, if only to prove Zhang false. So an assistant county magistrate, Wang Shihe, and a company commander, Yu Yicheng, were sent to confirm the veracity of Zhang's story. Zhang was brought with them in chains.

The Ming delegation arrived in March 1603 and was received by the governor, Pedro Bravo de Acuña. They were treated well but when they tried to administer justice in the Chinese community, they were ordered to stop. In May they made it clear to the governor that they did not believe there was a mountain of gold but were obliged to obey their orders. 

The governor let them go to Cavite, where they took a basket of dirt and then left for China. The Spanish did not believe the expedition had been sent just to search for gold. The Archbishop of Manila Miguel de Benavides, O. P. suspected that it had been a probe sent to spy on Manila in preparation for a major Chinese invasion. They feared that the local Chinese would cooperate with such an invasion. The Spanish, Filipino, and even Japanese residents began to threaten the Chinese.

Rebellion

A large group of Chinese planned a strike. The Chinese mayor, Juan Bautista de la Vera, a wealthy Catholic, tried to dissuade them but found that his own adopted son was the leader. They tried to persuade him to become their leader, but he refused and reported them to the Spaniards. The Spaniards arrested him after finding gunpowder in his house and eventually executed him.

Alerted to the unrest among the Chinese, the Spanish shut the city gates on the night of October 3. One Spanish family was murdered north of the Pasig while an attack on the church in Tondo was repelled by Spanish soldiers. Their commander, Luis Pérez Dasmariñas, overconfident of Spanish strength, decided to pursue the Chinese. When cautioned from attacking by his fellow officers, he derided them as cowards and retorted that "twenty five Spaniards were enough to conquer the whole of China". They followed the Chinese into a swamp, where they were surrounded and cut down.

On October 6, the Chinese rebels crossed the Pasig and prepared an attack on the city walls with ladders and siege towers. While they had obtained some firearms from the Spaniards they had defeated, it was not enough to overcome the artillery on the walls. Their haphazard assaults were defeated and their ladders and towers demolished by cannon shots. After a day or two, Spanish and Japanese soldiers started to sortie out and attack the Chinese with support from Filipino auxiliaries. The Chinese fled and were pursued throughout the countryside in the following weeks. Those who were captured were killed, and no prisoners were taken in the aftermath. An estimated 15,000 to 25,000 Chinese were slaughtered.

Aftermath
After the slaughter, the Spanish realized that they could not survive without Chinese trade and industry. They assured the remaining Chinese merchants that normal trade would be restored and continue as usual. Spanish officials sent letters to Fujian and Guangdong authorities explaining what had happened. In Fujian, the officials blamed most of what had occurred on Zhang Yi, but replied that the Spanish should not have killed the Chinese, and that the widows and orphans should be sent back to China. No further action was taken. 

Because the Chinese town had been devastated, Chinese merchants visiting Manila in 1604 were given fine lodging inside the walled city. Trade quickly returned to normal with the trade value for 1606–1610 averaging over 3 million pesos per year, the highest 5-year average in the history of the trade.

The Chinese continued to live under Spanish rule. Although they were exempt from the labour and petty personal dues required of the Filipinos, the Chinese had to pay a license fee of 8 pesos per year, often suffering additional extortion and harassment from sellers. They were also subject to population control in addition to the license fee, with the Spanish establishing a limit of 6,000 in Manila. But the ethnic Chinese population in the 1620s and 1630s ranged from 15,000 to 21,000. The Chinese petitioned the king of Spain for self-government, but this proposal was rejected in 1630. 

As the Chinese population continued to swell, reaching 33,000–45,000 by 1639, they entered other industries such as farming. They were laborers on their own in outlying areas, employed on estates of religious orders, or used as farm labor in forced settlement projects. This large rural Chinese population rebelled again in 1639, and suffered another massacre.

Notes

References

  (Online version)
 
 
 

1603 in the Philippines
17th-century rebellions
Chinese diaspora in the Philippines
Conflicts in 1603
History of Manila
History of the Philippines (1565–1898)
Philippine revolts against Spain